Echeda is a village in Dagestan, Russia.

Militants 
On 11 July 2014, a member of an illegal armed formation, who opened fire at law enforcers from the roof of a mosque, was shot dead in Echeda. The militants were identified as Merza Abdulkerimov, the leader of the Tsumandin gang, and his second-in-command Magomed Khuchbarov.

References 

Rural localities in Tsumadinsky District